Old Dominion University (Old Dominion or ODU) is a public research university in Norfolk, Virginia. It was established in 1930 as the Norfolk Division of the College of William & Mary and is now one of the largest universities in Virginia with an enrollment of 24,286 students for the 2021 academic year. Old Dominion University also enrolls over 700 international students from 89 countries.

Old Dominion University is classified among "R1: Doctoral Universities – Very high research activity". According to the National Science Foundation, ODU spent $60.3 million on research and development in 2018. It contributes nearly $2 billion annually in economic impact to the regional economy.

The university offers 168 undergraduate and graduate degree programs to approximately 24,000 students across seven colleges and three schools. Old Dominion University has approximately 124,000 alumni in all 50 states and 67 countries. Old Dominion University derives its name from one of Virginia's state nicknames, "The Old Dominion", given to the state by King Charles II of England for remaining loyal to the crown during the English Civil War.

History

Old Dominion University was founded in 1930 as a Norfolk extension of the College of William and Mary. This branch was envisioned by administrators and officials such as Robert M. Hughes, a member of the Board of Visitors of William and Mary  from 1893 to 1917, and J. A. C. Chandler, the eighteenth president of that school. In 1924 after becoming the director of the William and Mary extension in Norfolk, Joseph Healy began organizing classes and finding locations for faculty and staff. Due to his work, along with that of Robert M. Hughes, J. A. C. Chandler, and A. H. Foreman, a two-year branch division was established on March 13, 1930. On September 12, 1930, the Norfolk Division of the College of William and Mary held its first class with 206 students (125 men and 81 women) in the old Larchmont School building, an unused elementary school on Hampton Boulevard. On September 3, 1930, H. Edgar Timmerman became the Division's first director.

"The Division", as it was often called, started out in the old Larchmont School building and allowed people with fewer financial assets to attend a school of higher education for two years.  Tuition for the first year was US$50. The following September, Virginia Polytechnic Institute, more commonly known as Virginia Tech, also began offering classes at "The Division.", expanding course offerings to teachers and engineers. Created as it was in the first year of the Great Depression, the college benefited from federal funding as part of President Franklin D. Roosevelt's New Deal. The Public Works Administration provided funds for the Administration Building, now Rollins Hall, and Foreman Field, named after A. H. Foreman, an early proponent of the college. The college grew south along Hampton Boulevard, turning an empty field into a sprawling campus.

In 1932, Lewis Warrington Webb joined the faculty as an instructor of engineering; he would later be called "the Father of Old Dominion". After serving ten years as an instructor at the Norfolk Division of the College of William and Mary, Webb was appointed assistant director in 1942. Webb also served as director of the Defense and War Training Program from 1940 to 1944. Through its defense and training classes, the Norfolk Division contributed to the American WWII war effort. The program also allowed the school to remain open during a period when many young men were in armed service. The program attracted many women, who learned aircraft repair, drafting, and other war-related subjects. In 1946, Webb was appointed Director of the Norfolk Division. Webb's dream was to see the Norfolk Division become an independent institution.The two-year Norfolk Division rapidly evolved into a four-year institution, gaining independence from William and Mary in 1962. On February 16, 1962, the William and Mary system was dissolved under General Assembly legislation that was signed by Governor Albertis S. Harrison. Later that year the Norfolk Division was renamed Old Dominion College. Webb served as the first president of Old Dominion College from 1962 to 1969.

Frank Batten, who was the publisher of The Virginian-Pilot and The Ledger-Star and member of the Norfolk Division's advisory board, was chosen as the first rector of Old Dominion College on May 27, 1962, holding the position until 1970. (The College of Engineering was named in his honor in 2004.) In 1964, the first students lived on campus in dormitories Rogers Hall and Gresham Hall, named for members of the advisory board.

Growth in enrollment, expansion of research facilities, and preparation for graduate programs led the board to seek to university status. In 1969, Old Dominion College transitioned to Old Dominion University under the leadership of President James L. Bugg, Jr. During Bugg's tenure, the earliest doctoral programs were established, along with a university-wide governance structure with representation from faculty, administrators and students. Bugg also reestablished the Army ROTC program that had been originally created in 1948 but abandoned during the Korean War.

In the 1970s, under President Alfred B. Rollins, Jr., Old Dominion established partnerships between regional organizations such as NASA, the U.S. Navy, Eastern Virginia Medical School, and Norfolk State University. Under Rollins, the university expanded its state and private funding, improved student services and introduced an honors program.

Since this time, the university has continued to expand, now enrolling over 24,000 students. The Norfolk campus has experienced significant growth in both student population and geography. Additionally, ODU has established satellite campuses in Virginia Beach, Portsmouth, and Hampton.

In 2022, the university announced a $500 million capital campaign.

Directors and presidents

The Jacobson House is the on-campus home for the university president.

Academics

As a comprehensive university, Old Dominion University offers and develops humanities, science, health sciences, technology, engineering, business, arts, education, and professional programs. The university offers 73 bachelor's degrees, 60 master's degrees, and 35 doctoral degrees in a wide range of fields.

Because Hampton Roads is a major international maritime and commerce center, the university has a special mission for the Commonwealth of Virginia in commerce, and in international affairs and cultures. With the principal marine and aerospace activities of the Commonwealth concentrated in Hampton Roads, the university has a significant commitment to science, engineering and technology, specifically in marine science, aerospace and other fields of major importance to the region. Many departments conduct cooperative research with NASA. ODU is one of the few universities in the US to offer MBA concentrations in maritime, transportation, and port logistics management and also has well-respected programs in marine science and coastal and transportation engineering. Due to its location in a large metropolitan area, Old Dominion University places particular emphasis on urban issues, including education and health care, and on the arts.

Accreditation

Old Dominion University is accredited by the Southern Association of Colleges and Schools Commission on Colleges (SACS/COC) to award baccalaureate, masters, education specialist, and doctoral degrees. The Batten College of Engineering and Technology is accredited by the Engineering Accreditation Commission of ABET. The Strome College of Business is AACSB accredited. The Darden College of Education, the College of Arts and Letters and the College of Sciences are accredited by National Council for Accreditation of Teacher Education.

Colleges and Schools

College of Arts and Letters

The College of Arts and Letters offers undergraduate and graduate degree programs in the humanities, arts, and social sciences.

Departments include: Art, African American & African Studies, Asian Studies, Communication & Theatre Arts, English, History, Humanities, Interdisciplinary Studies, International Studies, Music, Philosophy & Religious Studies, Political Science & Geography, Sociology & Criminal Justice, Women's Studies, and World Languages & Cultures.

College of Sciences 
The College of Sciences offers undergraduate and graduate degree programs across seven departments: Biological Sciences, Chemistry & Biochemistry, Computer Science, Mathematics & Statistics, Ocean & Earth Sciences, Physics, and Psychology.

College of Health Sciences 
The College of Health Sciences offers undergraduate and graduate degree programs across five schools: School of Community & Environmental Health, Gene W. Hirschfeld School of Dental Hygiene, School of Medical Diagnostic and Translational Services, School of Nursing, and School of Rehabilitation Sciences.

Planning is underway for the establishment of a new School of Public Health. ODU is also currently exploring an integration of institutions with Eastern Virginia Medical School, which is approximately 2 miles south of ODU's main campus.

School of Data Science
In his 2022 State of the University Address, President Hemphill announced plans for the establishment of a new School of Data Science. The School of Data Science will offer undergraduate and graduate degree programs.

Batten College of Engineering and Technology
The Batten College of Engineering and Technology offers undergraduate and graduate degree programs across six departments: Civil & Environmental Engineering, Computational Modeling & Simulation Engineering, Electrical & Computer Engineering, Engineering Management & Systems Engineering, Engineering Technology, and Mechanical & Aerospace Engineering. The college offers several concentrations, including coastal engineering, transportation engineering, experimental aeronautics, laser and plasma engineering, bioelectrics, computational engineering, and ship maintenance, repair, and operations.

In 2010, the Frank Batten College of Engineering and Technology became the first college in the United States offering all degrees in the emerging discipline of Modeling and Simulation (B.S., M.E., M.S., D.Eng., Ph.D.).

School of Cybersecurity 
On October 1, 2020, Old Dominion University launched the School of Cybersecurity, the first of its kind in the country. The ODU School of Cybersecurity offers a B.S degree program in Cybersecurity, Cyber Operations, and an M.S in Cybersecurity. Faculty and staff are drawn from across all colleges and reporting units at the university, including information technology services, VMASC, and military affairs.

Strome College of Business 

The Strome College of Business college offers undergraduate and graduate degree programs across six departments and three schools: Economics, Finance, Management, Marketing, Information Technology & Decision Sciences, International Business, along with the School of Accountancy, School of Public Service, and the Harvey Lindsay School of Real Estate.

The Gregory A. Lumsden Trading Room and Research Lab (LTR), opened in fall 2012, is equipped with 24 Bloomberg terminals, making it one of the largest labs in the United States.

In 2014, the College of Business and Public Administration was renamed to the Strome College of Business after the Strome family donated $11 million to the college.

In 2019, the Strome College of Business opened the Institute for Innovation & Entrepreneurship (IIE) in downtown Norfolk. IIE is a one-stop shop for the community, students, faculty/staff and alumni seeking resources and services for innovation, entrepreneurship, and new enterprises and programs. The Institute contains the Strome Entrepreneurial Center (SEC), Tempo, the Veterans Business Outreach Center (VBOC), the Women's Business Center (WBC), the Business Development Center (BDC), and the Open Seas Technology Innovation Hub.

Darden College of Education and Professional Studies 

The Darden College of Education and Progressional Studies offers undergraduate and graduate degree programs across six departments. Programs include: educational leadership and school administration, counseling, human services, higher education, exercise science, athletic training, sport management, physical education, recreation and tourism studies, early childhood education, speech pathology, special education, fashion merchandising, instructional design and technology, business and industry training, community college teaching, and technology education.

The Darden College of Education also works in collaboration with other academic colleges to prepare teachers in fields of secondary education, such as English education, biology education, etc. Students complete a major in the field they wish to teach, in addition to education coursework, practica, and student teaching.

Perry Honors College 

The Perry Honors College provides high-achieving undergraduates an opportunity to get the most out of their academic experience. Traditional classes are combined with Honors courses, experiential learning, undergraduate research, campus events, and a capstone experience. Honors courses are offered in a small class setting with some of the best faculty members on campus, providing an environment for holding lively discussions and building personal relationships.

The Graduate School 
The Graduate School supports graduate programs, graduate students, and postdoctoral fellows.

Distance Learning
Old Dominion University began offering distance learning courses in 1994 through Teletechnet, a satellite delivery system. Currently, ODU offers more than 100 undergraduate and graduate degree programs online through ODU Global. ODU partners with the Virginia Community College System (VCCS) to offer other services such as libraries, computer labs, exam proctoring, and disability services all around the state. ODU also offers programs designed to be taken by military personnel on deployment.

Research
Old Dominion University research teams generate $88 million in annual funding through more than 400 ongoing projects supported by grants from NSF, NIH, Department of Energy, and the DOD.

The university is classified among "R1: Doctoral Universities – Very high research activity."
Research Centers at the university include:

 Applied Research Center
 Center for Accelerator Science
 Center for Coastal Physical Oceanography
 Center for Educational Partnerships
 Center for Innovative Transportation Solutions
 Center for Quantitative Fisheries Ecology
 Center for Telehealth Innovation, Education & Research (C-TIER)
 Dragas Center For Economic Analysis and Policy
 E.V. Williams Center for Real Estate
 Engineering Makerspace and Invention Center (EMIC)
 Frank Reidy Research Center for Bioelectrics
 International Maritime, Ports, & Logistics Institute
 National Centers for System of Systems Engineering (NCSOSE)
 Plasma Engineering & Medicine Institute
 Social Science Research Center
 Virginia Institute for Image & Vision Analysis
 Virginia Institute for Spaceflight & Autonomy
 Virginia Modeling, Analysis, and Simulation Center (VMASC)

Center for Accelerator Science 
The Center for Accelerator Science in the Physics Department at Old Dominion University is an interdisciplinary research center, involving faculty from four departments. The center operates in close partnership with the Thomas Jefferson National Accelerator Facility. The center is unique in Virginia and one of only a handful of such programs in the country. The goal of the center is to meet the nation's need for scientists and engineers who will advance the next generation of accelerators and light-sources - tools that enable an ever-widening range of basic and applied research, numerous medical applications, as well as industrial and Homeland Security functions. The center offers both researchers and students access to state-of-the-art facilities at ODU and Jefferson Laboratory.

Center for Telehealth Innovation, Education & Research (C-TIER) 
The mission of C-TIER is to promote innovation, education, and research in telehealth for those involved in the provision of health care, healthcare education, research, and healthcare technologies through collaborative opportunities, educational programs, and telehealth innovation.

Climate Change and Sea Level Rise Initiative (CCSLRI)
ODU's Climate Change and Sea Level Rise Initiative (CCSLRI) has facilitated research and education on climate change and resulting sea level rise. Old Dominion's maritime location allows special emphasis on adaptation to increased flooding due to sea level rise.

Dragas Center for Economic Analysis and Policy 
The Dragas Center for Economic Analysis and Policy in the Strome College of Business at Old Dominion University undertakes economic, demographic, transportation and defense-oriented studies. The Dragas Center produces the State of the Region Report for Hampton Roads, as well as the State of the Commonwealth Report for Virginia. The Dragas Center also produces economic forecasts for Hampton Roads, Virginia, and the United States.

International Maritime, Ports & Logistics Institute 
Old Dominion University's International Maritime, Ports, & Logistics Institute, in the Strome College of Business, was created through a university/business community partnership in Hampton Roads. Its function is to provide maritime, ports and logistics management education, training and research to meet regional, national and international needs.

At the October, 2011 Annual meeting of the International Association of Maritime Economists (IAME) in Santiago (Chile), university rankings worldwide in port research for the period 1980-2009 were announced. In these rankings, ODU was ranked eighth in the world, second only to the University of Washington in the Western Hemisphere.

Social Science Research Center 
The Social Science Research Center is a fully-equipped social science research center with staff expertise in various forms of research methods and data collection, including mail surveys, telephone surveys, household interviews, focus groups, and most conventional forms of data analysis.

SSRC staff can assist in all stages of research including instrument design, project management, data collection, data auditing, data management, data analysis, technical report writing, and the development of multi-media report presentations. We work with customers to determine their data collection and research needs and how to best accommodate those needs given time and budget restrictions.

Virginia Modeling, Analysis & Simulation Center (VMASC)
The Virginia Modeling, Analysis and Simulation Center (VMASC) is a university-wide multidisciplinary research center that emphasizes modeling, simulation, and visualization (MS&V) research, development and education.

VMASC is one of the world's leading research centers for computer modeling, simulation, and visualization. The mission of the center is to conduct collaborative MS&V research and development, provide expertise to government agencies and industry, and to promote Old Dominion University, Hampton Roads and Virginia as a center of MS&V activities. Annually, the center conducts approximately $10 million in funded research.

The Hampton Roads region is home to the Joint and Coalition Training (JCW), the US Army's Training and Doctrine Command, the Military Transportation Management Command, NATO Allied Command Transformation, the Armed Forces Staff College, the U.S. Navy's Commander Operational Test and Evaluation Force, the Naval Sea Systems Command, and the Space and Naval Warfare Center. In addition, the Department of Energy's Jefferson Lab, NASA-Langley Research Center and numerous regional industries are important users of MS&V technology. The economic value of MS&V-related business activity in Hampton Roads is estimated to be over $500 million.

VMASC concentrates on eight core modeling and simulation applied research areas: Transportation, Homeland Security and Military Defense, Virtual Environments, Social Sciences, Medicine & Health, Care, Game-based Learning, M&S Interoperability, System Sciences.

Campus

Norfolk Campus
The Norfolk campus is the main campus for Old Dominion University. It is situated between two rivers - Elizabeth River to the west and Lafayette River to the east, approximately 5 miles north of downtown Norfolk. The campus is situated between three historic neighborhoods: Larchmont, Lambert's Point, and Highland Park. The Norfolk campus houses undergraduate and graduate programs, residence halls, dining facilities, and athletic facilities.

Williamsburg Lawn 
The Williamsburg Lawn is the oldest part of campus. The original buildings on campus, including Rollins Hall and Spong Hall, are located here.

Kaufman Mall 
Constant Hall (Stome College of Business), Dragas Hall (College of Arts and Letters), Monarch Hall (College of Engineering and Technology, School of Cybersecurity), Kaufman Hall (College of Engineering and Technology), and Webb Center (Student Union) are situated around Kaufman Mall.

Runte Quad 
The Runte Quad is a collection of seven new residential buildings—Ireland House (2006), Virginia House (2007), Scotland House (2008), France House (2009), England House (2009), Dominion House (2009), Owens House (2020). Owens house is designed to integrate living and learning. Most of the 470 beds are occupied by cybersecurity, entrepreneurial and STEM-H students, those majoring in science, technology, engineering, math and health sciences. Constructed alongside the Quad is the new Student Recreation Center (SRC), the Student Health Center, and Broderick Dining Commons.

University Libraries & Academic Quads 

The Old Dominion University Libraries - the Patricia W. and J. Douglas Perry Library, the F. Ludwig Diehn Composers Room, and the Elise N. Hofheimer Art Library are located on the Norfolk Campus. The libraries contain over 3 million items—books, government publications, journals and serials, microform, musical scores, recordings, and maps. In 2011, the Perry Library first floor was transformed into The Learning Commons.

Perry Library is situated along a quad, south of Kaufman Mall. The quad includes Perry Library, the Engineering Systems Building, the Gornto Teletechnet Building, the Darden Education Building, and Batten Arts and Letters Building.

The College of Science buildings are grouped together around a pond, adjacent to Kaufman Mall, the Perry Library Quad, and the Runte Quad.

Elizabeth River 
The western edge of campus is along the Elizabeth River. The Powhatan Apartments and Whitehurst Residence Hall are in this area, near student recreational facilities and the ODU sports facilities.

Colley Bay 
Student residence halls (Rogers Hall, Gresham Hall) and a dining hall (Rogers Riverside Cafe) are located in the northeastern part of campus.

University Village 

University Village is located to the east of Hampton Blvd on the Norfolk Campus. Established in 1995, the ODU Real Estate Foundation has led the development of University Village, a mixed use development including retail, residential, and office buildings. Over the years, University Village has grown to include: Ted Constant Convocation Center, University Village Student Apartments, Innovation Research Park, Marriott SpringHill Suites Hotel, University Village Bookstore, University Fitness Center, Barry Arts Building, Hixon Art Studio, Barry Art Museum, Gordon Art Galleries, University Theatre, Goode Theatre, along with several restaurants and shops.

In 2022, it was announced that University Village will be expanded further (between 39th and 41st streets) to include new apartment buildings, new retail/restaurants, and a Publix grocery store.

New and Planned Facilities 
ODU has expanded its sports facilities, recently completing the Folkes-Stevens Indoor Tennis Center and the Powhatan Sports Complex, a  facility that houses the intercollegiate athletic programs of field hockey, women's lacrosse, and football. In 2017, the Mitchum Basketball Performance Center, a practice facility for the ODU basketball teams, was built as an addition to the Ted Constant Convocation Center (Chartway Arena). In 2019, Old Dominion University's historic Foreman Field was torn down and replaced with the new football stadium, SB Ballard Stadium. In 2021, planning and fundraising was started for the $20 million renovation of the Baseball Complex.
Among the new/renovated academic facilities are Constant Hall (Home of the Strome College of Business), Batten Arts and Letters Building, the Perry Library Student Success Center and Learning Commons, the E.V. Williams Engineering and Computational Sciences Building, and the Engineering Systems Building.

In 2016, the new Education Building was opened, as well as a new 45,000 square foot student dining facility, named Broderick Dining Commons.

In 2021, the new Chemistry Building was opened, and the university broke ground on the new Health Sciences Building (scheduled to open in 2023).

In 2022, the university initiated plans to build a new Biology Building (scheduled to open in 2026), and to renovate the ODU Inn into the new ODU Police Building.

In 2023, the new Student Health & Wellness Center will open. The facililty is attached to the Student Recreation Center, along the Runte Quad.

Plans are also underway for a new building to house the School of Data Science, and a new Student Success Center.

ODU Virginia Beach 
Old Dominion University has a satellite campus in Virginia Beach, known as the ODU Virginia Beach Center. Located in the Princess Anne area of Virginia Beach, It offers a range of undergraduate and graduate programs. The ODU Virginia Beach Center offers an array of amenities including a Learning Commons for students, a study lounge, and space for special events.

ODU is expanding its Virginia Beach campus to Town Center, set to open in 2023.

ODU Tri-Cities Center 
Old Dominion University has a satellite campus in Portsmouth, VA, known as the ODU Tri-Cities Center. ODU Tri-Cities Center is a full-service facility offering upper level undergraduate 300- and 400-level degree completion classes, graduate and certificate programs, admissions, registration, advising and other student services for residents of Portsmouth, Chesapeake, Suffolk and surrounding areas.

ODU Peninsula Center 
Old Dominion University has a satellite campus in Hampton, VA, known as the ODU Peninsula Center. ODU Peninsula Center is a full-service facility offering upper level undergraduate 300- and 400-level degree completion classes, graduate and certificate programs, admissions, registration, advising and other student services for residents of Hampton, Newport News, Williamsburg and surrounding areas.

Student Life

Residence Halls
ODU's current residence hall capacity is approximately 5,300 students across 4 neighborhoods on the Norfolk campus. All freshmen are guaranteed housing, 77% of freshmen and 24% of all undergraduate students live in university owned or operated housing. A private, student-only apartment complex (Proximity at ODU) houses approximately 1,000 additional students on campus, in University Village.

Dining 
There are three dining halls on campus: Broderick Dining Commons, Rogers Riverside Cafe, and Ms. Ruby's Cafe. There are many additional restaurants on campus in the Webb Center and University Village.

Student Recreation
The Student Recreation Center (SRC) is located in the middle of the ODU campus adjacent to the Rosane Runte Quad. The facility includes: 15,000 sq. ft. Multi-Level Fitness Center with strength, cardio, and free-weights, indoor swimming pool, indoor running track, three-court gymnasium, multi-purpose court, three group exercise studios, cycling studio, three racquetball courts, pro shop, Outdoor Adventure and Rental Center, bike and skate shop and an indoor climbing wall. SRC field, a multi-purpose turf field, is located next to the SRC building.

The University Fitness Center (UFC) was designed to accommodate Old Dominion's growing community. The UFC is located in University Village on Monarch Way between 42nd and 43rd Street and is equipped with user-friendly LifeFitness cardio and weight machines.

The ODU Outdoor Adventure program allows students to take organized trips and participate in activities such as hiking, mountain biking, camping, surfing, yoga, rock climbing, snowboarding and skiing.

Along the Elizabeth River, ODU has sand volleyball courts, a boardwalk, and a challenge course on campus as well.

ROTC Program
The ODU Army ROTC battalion was established in September 1969 in the Darden College of Education. The first cadets were commissioned on July 4, 1971. As of spring of 2008, ODU has been recognized as having the sixth largest Army ROTC unit out of 262 programs found nationwide. In June 2018, Major Promotable Rhana S. Kurdi became the first female Professor of Military Science.

Navy ROTC program is run in conjunction with the neighboring campuses of Norfolk State University and Hampton University. The Hampton Roads Naval Reserve Officer Training Corps is one of the largest officer training battalions in the US, consisting of over 250 Sailors, Marines, and Midshipmen, with an above average prior enlisted presence.

Student Organizations
Old Dominion University recognizes over 300 student organizations with over 8,000 student members. These groups include professional organizations, honor societies, religious organizations, minority students, and groups for students with common interests and majors as well as a variety of traditional, multicultural, and professional sororities and fraternities. The Student Government Association has direct authority over student organizations.

Campus Ministries
ODU students can join campus ministries which are coordinated by the University Chaplain's Association (UCA). Ministries include the United Methodist, Baptist, Roman Catholic, Episcopalian, Presbyterian and Lutheran denominationally sponsored ministries. InterVarsity Christian Fellowship has a presence at ODU and are members of the UCA. Each of these churches has a campus ministry presence at ODU, as does Hillel: The Foundation for Jewish Campus Life, and the Tidewater Islamic Center.

Greek Life
Old Dominion has a complex and diverse Greek system with thirteen fraternities and eleven sororities. There is also a variety of service fraternities active on campus.

Athletics

Old Dominion's 18 athletic teams are known as the Monarchs and mostly compete in the NCAA Division I Sun Belt Conference (SBC). They have captured 28 team national championships and four individual titles.

The school's most nationally acclaimed sports team is the Lady Monarchs basketball team, who won three national championships in 1979 (AIAW), 1980 (AIAW) and 1985 (NCAA). The Lady Monarchs also made it to the 1997 Women's NCAA Championship Game, losing to Tennessee. ODU athletic teams have won 15 national championships in men's and women's sailing, and 9 national championships in women's field hockey. The Lady Monarchs' nine national titles in field hockey are the most in NCAA history.

In addition, Old Dominion's athletic teams have captured 51 conference championships in the Colonial Athletic Association Conference, 7 conference championships in Conference USA, and 7 conference championships in the Sun Belt Conference.

On May 17, 2012, Old Dominion announced it would move to C-USA on July 1, 2013. Four ODU sports which are not sponsored by C-USA have outside affiliations. In 2013, the Wrestling team became an associate of the Mid-American Conference and the field hockey team joined the reconfigured Big East Conference. The women's lacrosse team spent the 2014 season (played in the 2013–14 school year) as an independent before joining the Atlantic Sun Conference. Finally, the women's rowing team joined the Big 12 Conference in 2014–15 after the Big 12 effectively took over C-USA rowing. Most recently, the men's swimming and diving team, which was left without a conference affiliation for two years because C-USA sponsors the sport only for women, joined the Coastal Collegiate Swimming Association, later renamed the Coastal Collegiate Sports Association, effective with the 2015–16 season. ODU joined the Sun Belt Conference on July 1, 2022.

Notable faculty

 Robert L. Ash, Mechanical and Aerospace Engineering
 Mohammad Ataul Karim
 Mounir Laroussi, Electrical & Computer Engineering
 Mark Mostert, Associate professor of Special Education
 Janis Sanchez-Hucles, Professor Emerita in Psychology
 G. William Whitehurst

Notable alumni

References

External links

Official Distance Learning website
Old Dominion Athletics website
Special Collections and University Archives Wiki, Old Dominion University Libraries

 
Public universities and colleges in Virginia
Educational institutions established in 1930
Universities and colleges accredited by the Southern Association of Colleges and Schools
Education in Norfolk, Virginia
Distance education institutions based in the United States
Tourist attractions in Norfolk, Virginia
1930 establishments in Virginia
Buildings and structures in Norfolk, Virginia
History of Norfolk, Virginia